Malaysia national under-22 football team 2010–present results.

Results

Keynotes

 * Malaysia's score always listed first
 (H) Home country stadium
 (A) Away country stadium
 (N) Neutral venue stadium
 1 Non FIFA 'A' international match

2010–present results

2019

2017

2012

References